The Mark 82 (Mk 82) is an unguided, low-drag general-purpose bomb, part of the United States Mark 80 series. The explosive filling is usually tritonal, though other compositions have sometimes been used.

Development and deployment 

It is a streamlined steel casing containing  of Tritonal high explosive. The Mk 82 is offered with a variety of fin kits, fuzes, and retarders for different purposes.

The Mk 82 is the warhead for the GBU-12 laser-guided bombs and for the GBU-38 JDAM.

Currently only the General Dynamics plant in Garland, Texas and Nitro-Chem in Bydgoszcz, Poland are Department of Defense-certified to manufacture bombs for the US Armed Forces.

The Mk 82 is currently undergoing a minor redesign to allow it to meet the insensitive munitions requirements set by Congress.

According to a test report conducted by the United States Navy's Weapon System Explosives Safety Review Board established in the wake of the 1967 USS Forrestal fire, the cooking off time for a Mk 82 is approximately 2 minutes 30 seconds.

More than 4,500 GBU-12/Mk 82 laser-guided bombs were dropped on Iraq during the Persian Gulf War. France requested 1,200 Mk 82s in 2010 to Société des Ateliers Mécaniques de Pont-sur-Sambre (SAMP) which builds Mk 82s under licence. Saudi Arabia requested 8,000 Mk 82s in 2015, along with guidance kits and other weapons.

Low-level delivery 
In low-level bombing, it is possible for the delivering aircraft to sustain damage from the blast and fragmentation effects of its own munitions since the aircraft and ordnance arrive at the target almost simultaneously. To address this issue, the standard Mk 82 General-Purpose bomb can be fitted with a special high-drag tail fin unit. In this configuration, it is referred to as the Mk 82 Snake Eye.

The tail unit has four folded fins which spring open into a cruciform shape when the bomb is released. The fins increase the drag of the bomb, slowing its forward progress and allowing the delivery aircraft to safely pass over the target before the bomb explodes.

Variants 
 BLU-111/B – Mk 82 casing filled with PBXN-109 (instead of Composition H6); item weighs . PBXN-109 is a less sensitive explosive filler when compared to H6. The BLU-111/B also is the warhead of the A-1 version of the Joint Stand-Off Weapon.
 BLU-111A/B – Used by the U.S. Navy, this is the BLU-111/B with a thermal-protective coating added to reduce cook-off in (fuel-related) fires.
 BLU-126/B – Designed following a U.S. Navy request to lower collateral damage in air strikes. Delivery of this type started in March 2007. Also known as the Low Collateral Damage Bomb (LCDB), it is a BLU-111 with a smaller explosive charge. Inert ballast is added to match the original weight of the BLU-111, which gives it the same trajectory when dropped.
 BLU-129/B – U.S. Air Force Mark 82 version with a composite warhead case which disintegrates upon detonation to minimize fragmentation, decreasing damage to nearby structures and reducing the chances of collateral damage. The carbon fiber composite shell achieves three-times less collateral damage by keeping the blast radius tight, while the tungsten-laden case high explosive has greater lethality in that blast radius. Entered service in 2011 with some 800 units produced until early 2015.  USAF is looking to restart production for domestic and international consumption.
 Mark 62 Quickstrike mine – A naval mine, which is a conversion of the Mark 82 bomb.
 Mark 82 Mod 7 – Near-term solution for cluster bomb replacement that replaces the forged steel casing with a unitary "cast ductile iron" warhead and reconfigured burst height and fuze locations, dispersing iron fragmentation over a large area to fulfill area-attack requirements with less chance of unexploded ordnance.  To enter service by 2018.
 MK82-T (Tendürek) –Turkish variant of Mk 82 with a thermobaric warhead, can be fitted with locally produced HGK, LGK and KGK guidance kits.

See also 
 Mark 81 bomb
 Mark 83 bomb
 Mark 84 bomb
 Paveway IV
 Armement Air-Sol Modulaire
 FAB-250 – Soviet counterpart

References

External links 

 Mk82 General-Purpose Bomb
 Bombs, Fuzes, and associated Components

Cold War aerial bombs of the United States
Aerial bombs of the United States
Military equipment introduced in the 1950s